Sibynophis chinensis, commonly known as  the Chinese many-toothed snake, is a nonvenomous species of colubrid snake found in Vietnam, China, and Taiwan.

References

Sibynophis
Reptiles of Vietnam
Reptiles of China
Reptiles of Taiwan
Reptiles described in 1889
Taxa named by Albert Günther